Lapithas is a mountain located in southern Elis in the western Peloponnese in Greece. The mountain is named after the mythical people, the Lapiths. In the west the mountain touches the Ionian Sea. It is 15 to 20 km long and 10 km wide and covers and area of 100 to 150 km². A large part of the mountain is covered with pine forests, but has suffered great damage in the forest fires of August 2007.

The Kaiafas Lake lies between the Lapithas and the Ionian Sea, northwest of the town Zacharo. The Greek National Road 76 (Megalopoli - Andritsaina - Krestena) passes northeast of the Lapithas, and the Greek National Road 9/E55 (Patras - Pyrgos - Kalamata) lies to the west.

Nearest places

Smerna, Vrina and Xirochori are villages on the mountain.

 North: Krestena, Gryllos, Graikas
 East: Platiana and Makistos
 South: Zacharo
 West: Kato Samiko

External links

Landforms of Elis
Lapithas